Lisa Jayne Bayliss (born 27 November 1966 in Walsall, Birmingham, England is a former field hockey player, who was a member of the British squad that won the bronze medal at the 1992 Summer Olympics

External links
 
 
 
 

English female field hockey players
Field hockey players at the 1992 Summer Olympics
Olympic field hockey players of Great Britain
British female field hockey players
Olympic bronze medallists for Great Britain
1966 births
Living people
Place of birth missing (living people)
Olympic medalists in field hockey
Medalists at the 1992 Summer Olympics